Oxley is a town in Victoria, Australia, located on Snow Road,  south-east of Wangaratta, in the Rural City of Wangaratta.

Oxley derives its name from the Oxley Plains, which were named in 1824 by the explorers Hume and Hovell after John Oxley, the Surveyor-General of New South Wales. Oxley Post Office opened on 1 January 1870. An earlier office named Oxley became Milawa.
The township served as the administrative centre of the Shire of Oxley until 1936.

References

Jones, Graham (1995)  Memories of Oxley, Charquin Hill Publishing.

External links

 Australian Places: Oxley
Oxley, Victoria community website

Towns in Victoria (Australia)
Rural City of Wangaratta